The 1987 season of the astronomy TV show Jack Horkheimer: Star Hustler starring Jack Horkheimer started on January 5, 1987. During this season, the show still had its original name, Jack Horkheimer: Star Hustler. The show's episode numbering scheme changed several times during its run to coincide with major events in the show's history. The official Star Gazer website hosts the complete scripts for each of the shows.


1987 season

References

External links 
  Star Gazer official website
 
 May 4-10, 1987 episode on YouTube
 June 29-July 5, 1987 episode on FuzzyMemories.TV
 April, May, and June 1987 episodes on YouTube
 1980's episodes on YouTube
 October 5-11, 1987 episode on YouTube

Jack Horkheimer:Star Hustler
1987 American television seasons